Dermomurex glicksteini is a species of sea snail, a marine gastropod mollusk in the family Muricidae, the murex snails or rock snails.

Description

The shell grows to a length of 16 mm.

Distribution
Locus typicus: "(Trawled from) 150 metres depth, off Palm Beach Island, 
Palm Beach County, Florida, USA."

This marine species occurs off Eastern Florida, USA and the Bermudas.

References

 Merle D., Garrigues B. & Pointier J.-P. (2011) Fossil and Recent Muricidae of the world. Part Muricinae. Hackenheim: Conchbooks. 648 pp. page(s): 214

Gastropods described in 1987
Dermomurex